ο Sagittarii, Latinized as Omicron Sagittarii, is a single star in the constellation Sagittarius. It is yellow in hue and visible to the naked eye with an apparent visual magnitude of +3.77. The distance to this star is approximately 142 light years based on parallax. It is drifting further away from the Sun with a radial velocity of +26 km/s, having come to within  around a million years ago.

This object is position 0.86 degrees north of the ecliptic, so ο Sagittarii can be occulted by the Moon and very rarely by planets. The last occultation by a planet took place on 24 December 1937, when it was occulted by Mercury. It was almost eclipsed by the sun, which occupies a mean, rounded, half of one degree of the sky, on 5 January. Thus the star can be viewed the whole night, crossing the sky, in early July.

This is an aging giant star with a stellar classification of G9IIIb. It is classified as a red clump giant, suggesting it is on the horizontal branch undergoing core helium fusion. The star is 2.39 billion years old with 1.80 times the mass of the Sun. It has expanded to 12 times the girth of the Sun and is radiating 67 times the Sun's luminosity from its swollen photosphere at an effective temperature of 4,744 K.

Name and etymology

References

K-type giants
Sagittarius (constellation)
Sagittarii, Omicron
Durchmusterung objects
Sagittarii, 39
177241
093683
7217